Academy of Engineering Sciences:
 Academy of Engineering Sciences (Sudan)
 Royal Swedish Academy of Engineering Sciences